Pool C of the First Round of the 2009 World Baseball Classic was held at Rogers Centre, Toronto, Canada from March 7 to 11, 2009.

Pool C was a modified double-elimination tournament. The winners for the first games matched up in the second game, while the losers faced each other in an elimination game. The winners of the elimination game then played the losers of the non-elimination game in another elimination game. The remaining two teams then played each other to determine seeding for the Pool 2.

Bracket

Results
Times of March 7 are Eastern Standard Time (UTC−05:00) and times from March 8 to 11 are Eastern Daylight Time (UTC−04:00).

United States 6, Canada 5

Venezuela 7, Italy 0

United States 15, Venezuela 6

Italy 6, Canada 2

Venezuela 10, Italy 1

Venezuela 5, United States 3

External links
Official website

Pool C
Baseball competitions in Toronto
International baseball competitions hosted by Canada
International sports competitions in Toronto
World Baseball Classic Pool C
World Baseball Classic Pool C